Fox Valley Lutheran High School (FVLHS or FVL) is a private, Lutheran, co-educational high school in Appleton, Wisconsin, United States. It was established in 1953 and is owned by a group of congregations of the Wisconsin Evangelical Lutheran Synod (WELS).

History 
In 1946, various Wisconsin Synod members in the Fox River Valley area began to discuss the possible creation of a "Valley Lutheran High School." When the school was founded in 1953, it began classes with only eight students and one full-time teacher, meeting in a school building rented from the Appleton School District. By the mid-1950s, enrollment had grown, and the school relocated to its own building at 2626 N. Oneida Street in 1957. Enrollment continued to grow during the 1960s and 1970s, requiring several additions to be made to the campus, including in 1965 and 1977.

In 2000, the school relocated to a  campus on Meade Street, selling its old campus to the Appleton Catholic Education System, which renovated it to accommodate the growing St. Joseph Middle School. In the summer of 2016, FVLHS added a metals shop and began offering automotive training in partnership with Fox Valley Technical College. In September 2017, the FVL General Board approved a $5.6 million expansion that added classroom and specialty spaces including a second art studio and a biomedical lab classroom. The new addition was dedicated in October 2018. School enrollment for the 2020–21 school year is 653 students.

Athletics 
The school is a member of the Wisconsin Interscholastic Athletic Association (WIAA) and competes in the North Eastern Conference. Boys' sports include baseball, basketball, cross country, football, golf, hockey, soccer, tennis, track and wrestling. Girls' sports include basketball, cheer and dance teams, cross country, golf, hockey, soccer, softball, tennis, track and volleyball. Both boys and girls compete in hockey in the Fox Cities Stars co-op teams.

Extracurriculars 
Extracurriculars at FVL are called "cocurriculars" because the school believes that such groups and activities are extensions of its mission. In 2020–21, twenty different opportunities are available to students. These include American Mentor Group (American students who volunteer to mentor international students), Art Club, Book Club, Chapel Pianists/Organists, Choraliers (swing choir), Cross & Crown (school yearbook), eSports Club, Forensics,
Future Business Leaders of America, FVL Theatre, Jazz Ensemble, Math Club, National Honor Society, Outdoor Club, 
Peer Leadership Group, SALT (Sound & Light Team), Student Council, Student Tutors, Trapshooting Club, and VEX Robotics.

References

External links 
 

High schools in Appleton, Wisconsin
Private high schools in Wisconsin
Secondary schools affiliated with the Wisconsin Evangelical Lutheran Synod
Lutheran schools in Wisconsin
Educational institutions established in 1953
1953 establishments in Wisconsin